Bhittaipedia is a project on Shah Jo Risalo, where all compilations, translations, books, research articles on the works of Shah Abdul Latif Bhittai are published. The project is developed by Abdul Majid Bhurgri Institute of Language Engineering, Hyderabad, Sindh Pakistan.

Development
Idea development was by computational linguist Amar Fayaz Buriro, who presented the concept of Bhittaipedia, where all translations of Shah Jo Risalo made by different authors and research papers including books may be publish on one Website as like Encyclopedia. Scientific data of animals, birds, places and human characters which were sung by Shah Abdul Latif Bhittai in his poetry will be provided in the research portal. Then Abdul Majid Bhurgri Institute of Language Engineering started work on this project.

Languages
Sindhi is a primary language of Bhittaipedia, while English, Arabic, Persian, Urdu and Punjabi translations are available on the web application. Her transliteration in Devanagari and Latin typography of each verse has been also published.

See also
 Shah Jo Risalo
 Shah Abdul Latif Bhittai
 Abdul Majid Bhurgri Institute of Language Engineering

References

External links 
 Bhittaipedia, complete Anthology based on Shah Jo Risalo

Sindhology
Encyclopedias of culture and ethnicity
Sindhi-language encyclopedias
Pakistani encyclopedias
21st-century encyclopedias
Pakistani online encyclopedias
 
Sufi literature
Sindhi folklore
Pakistani literature
Devotional literature
Sindhi poetry